John Ryan (7 October 1761 – 30 September 1847) was a loyalist printer.

Sometime between 1776 and 1780 he became an apprentice to John Howe, in Newport, Rhode Island. John Ryan married Amelia Mott on 22 November 1781 in New York City. He remained in New York until 1783, becoming a partner with William Lewis in the New-York Mercury and General Advertiser.

Career 
 1777-1779
 An apprentice to John Howe on the Newport Gazette
 1783
 Partner with William Lewis in New-York Mercury; and General Advertiser in New York City.
 18 December 1783 
 Partner with William Lewis in publishing Royal St. John's Gazette, and Nova-Scotia Intelligencer in Parrtown (later Saint John, New Brunswick); the first newspaper in New Brunswick. His relationship with William Lewis dissolved and the publication underwent a name change in 1786 to the St. John Gazette, and Weekly Advertiser with John Ryan as the publisher.
 1799
 Acquired the Royal Gazette from Christopher Sower and sold St. John Gazette to Jacob S. Mott.
 27 Aug 1807 – 1830s
Publisher of Newfoundland's first newspaper Royal Gazette and Newfoundland Advertiser, in St. John's, Newfoundland. Took on his son Michael Ryan as partner.
 1833–1835
 Published, in partnership with John Collier Withers, Journal of the Legislative Council of Newfoundland
 1836–1841
 Published, in partnership with John Collier Withers, Journal of His Majesty's Council of Newfoundland

Family 
John Ryan and Amelia Mott had seven children:
 Michael Ryan - printer of the New Brunswick Chronicle (Jan - Aug 1804), the Fredericton Telegraph (Aug 1806 - Feb 1807) and the Globe in Barbados.
 Lewis Kelly Ryan - publisher of Newfoundland Sentinel, and General Commercial Register
 Robert B. Ryan
 Ingraham Ryan
 John Ryan Jr
 Mary Somerindyke Ryan
 Sarah Maghee Ryan
 Leah Ryan

Printing as a Family Endeavor 
In her book, Maudie Whelan cites W.N. Glascock as having a first-hand account of printing in Newfoundland. It is likely that Glascock is referring to the Ryan family here:

References

More Reading 
 

1761 births
1847 deaths
Businesspeople from Newport, Rhode Island
United Empire Loyalists